GidiTraffic (or GIDITRAFFIC) is an online social service started on 23 September 2011. Based primarily on social media, the service employs crowdsourcing as its primary means of providing real-time traffic updates to subscribers on its platform. The service, delivered free of charge, affords its users access to various types of information. Though its broadest category of users is road users and motorists, GIDITRAFFIC lends itself as a platform for answering inquiries from anyone who requires information on any subject of interest. GIDITRAFFIC's core competence is in vehicular traffic reports, however, the service also handles all other forms of traffic (going by the fact that the word traffic also means "the mutual exchange of information").

Operation 

Users of the service log on to its Twitter feed to get up-to-date traffic information or to post a general inquiry, which GIDITRAFFIC then publishes to all subscribers. Through crowdsourced replies, a requester receives numerous responses from other subscribers who have seen the question and can provide a relevant answer.

In addition, updates are provided by subscribers to the platform via their mobile devices, thereby making the service effective in delivering traffic updates as they occur, and providing timely answers to other user inquiries.

This informs GIDITRAFFIC's motto of "Lending each other an eye", alluding to the collaboration and cooperation between the platform's users in making the service indispensable to its users.

Reception 

On Twitter, which is its primary platform, the service caters to over 1,600,000 subscribers, with the number increasing daily. The popularity of the platform stems from the fact that it not only keeps its subscribers abreast of the traffic situation in Lagos, the commercial capital city of Nigeria (well known for its many traffic jams), but users in other parts of the world. For a regular user of the platform, knowing where to avoid getting to a set destination in good time is well worth the two or three minutes it takes to access and scroll through the GIDITRAFFIC feed for updates.

Another interesting aspect of this platform is the identity of the person behind it. The sustained anonymity of this individual has sparked many discussions centering on his or her possible identity. Online, GIDITRAFFIC continuously publishes traffic updates and user questions, while keeping up witty interactions with the platform's followers round the clock – adding to the mystery and persona of the GIDITRAFFIC owner.

Awards and recognition

In early 2012, GIDITRAFFIC received a nomination for a Shorty Award in the Life-Saving Hero category. Although this did not translate into a win, it brought recognition and wider exposure for the service from international news outlets such as the BBC, Washington Post. and New York Times.

Back home in Nigeria, also in 2012, GIDITRAFFIC was honored with a Future Award for Best Use of New Media in recognition of the huge impact the service has had in terms of helping Lagos residents better manage time spent in traffic.

Mobile Applications 

In 2012, GIDITRAFFIC partnered with telecommunications company Nokia to produce a downloadable mobile traffic application (the GIDITRAFFIC application, available for Nokia Asha phones on Nokia's online store). There are plans to extend the application to a wider range of mobile phone platforms.

On 4 September 2013, the GIDITRAFFIC application for Nokia Lumia phones using Windows Phone 8 was launched on the Windows App Store.

References

External links 
 GidiTraffic's Shorty Awards nomination interview
 Vanguard Nigeria – on GidiTraffic's Shorty Award nomination
 The Nokia GidiTraffic Application

Social media
Twitter services and applications